Tong Enzheng (1935 – April 20, 1997) was a prominent Chinese archaeologist, historian, designer, and science fiction author.

Career 
Tong authored the textbook Cultural Anthropology and specialized in early southwest China. He also was involved in redesigning the Sichuan University Museum. He also became noted for his criticism of the influence of Lewis H. Morgan on Chinese anthropology. Tong also led the "Southern Silk Road Project.", pursuing the study of links between ancient Southeast Asia and China. 
Not many of Tong's publications in Chinese have been translated. In English, one of his most widely cited articles is a review of Chinese archaeology under socialism.

In science fiction he wrote the satirical New Journey to the West, and the short story Death Ray on a Coral Island. This won an award for "China's best short story" in 1978 and was later adapted to film. Both his science fiction writings as well as his archaeological and historical scholarly writings were reprinted in a multi-volume set issued in 1998 from Chongqing Publishing House (Tong Enzheng wenji, 3 volumes, 1998).

He died in the US after fleeing China following the Government crackdown on the protests at Tiananmen Square.  At the time, he was a visiting scholar at Wesleyan University, which has instituted a lecture series in his name, an Enzheng Tong Archaeology Library located at its Mansfield Freeman Center for East Asian Studies.

References 

1935 births
1997 deaths
Chinese science fiction writers
Chinese archaeologists
Wesleyan University people
Educators from Hunan
People from Ningxiang
Academic staff of Sichuan University
Scientists from Hunan
Writers from Changsha
20th-century novelists
Chinese emigrants to the United States
Chinese male novelists
Chinese male short story writers
People's Republic of China short story writers
Short story writers from Hunan
20th-century archaeologists